Harpiniopsis petulans is a species of crustacean in the family Phoxocephalidae. It was first described by Jerry Laurens Barnard in 1966, from specimens collected from submarine canyons in Southern California.

References

Gammaridea
Taxa described in 1966